Marie Kelly (born 9 February 1996) is an English cricketer who is currently the captain of Warwickshire, as well as playing for The Blaze and Trent Rockets. She plays primarily as a right-handed batter. She led Warwickshire to the 2019 Women's Twenty20 Cup title, and was the leading run-scorer in Division 1 that year. She previously played for Southern Vipers, Central Sparks and Birmingham Phoenix.

Early life
Kelly was born on 9 February 1996 in Birmingham, West Midlands. She has a degree in Sports Science from Loughborough University. Her twin sister, Sian, played for Warwickshire between 2011 and 2017.

Domestic career
Kelly made her county debut in 2011, for Warwickshire against Cheshire. She scored 12 runs and bowled 2 overs for no wicket. In 2012, in two innings over one weekend playing for Warwickshire Under-17s, Kelly scored 201* and 110* and soon after became a regular in Warwickshire's first team. She hit her maiden T20 half-century in 2013, against the Netherlands.

Kelly began captaining Warwickshire in 2015, standing-in for Rebecca Grundy. She became permanent captain of the side in 2016. In 2019, Kelly led her side to victory in the Twenty20 Cup. Warwickshire topped Division 1 by one point after beating runners-up Lancashire in the final match, with Kelly top-scoring with 76. She also ended the season as the leading run-scorer in Division 1. Kelly was Warwickshire's leading run-scorer in the 2021 Women's Twenty20 Cup, with 162 runs at an average of 81.00. She was again Warwickshire's leading run-scorer in the 2022 Women's Twenty20 Cup, with 192 runs at an average of 32.00. She scored two half-centuries on the same day in a double-header against Gloucestershire, 99 from 61 deliveries in the first match and 60 from 27 deliveries in the second. In the second match, her half-century came from 15 deliveries, which is the fastest recorded fifty in Women's Twenty20 cricket.

Kelly also played in the Women's Cricket Super League, for Loughborough Lightning in 2017 and Southern Vipers in 2019. She played one match for Loughborough, in which she scored 18 runs against Western Storm. She played five matches for the Vipers, scoring 13 runs at an average of 4.33. In 2020, Kelly was announced as part of the Central Sparks squad for the Rachael Heyhoe Flint Trophy. She was the side's second-highest run-scorer, with 223 runs at an average of 55.75, and scored two half-centuries. In December 2020, it was announced that Kelly was one of the 41 female cricketers that had signed a full-time domestic contract.

In 2021, Kelly scored 182 runs for Central Sparks in the Rachael Heyhoe Flint Trophy, including two half-centuries. In a Charlotte Edwards Cup match against Southern Vipers, Kelly hit 100* from 53 balls, her Twenty20 high score and first ever century, to help her side to a 6 wicket victory. She also signed to play for Birmingham Phoenix in The Hundred, but only made one appearance in the competition. At the end of the season it was announced that Kelly had moved to Lightning, and signed a professional contract with her new side. She played eleven matches for Lightning in 2022, across the Charlotte Edwards Cup and the Rachael Heyhoe Flint Trophy, scoring 197 runs and taking six wickets. She also played seven matches for Trent Rockets in The Hundred, scoring 40 runs.

Kelly has also been a part of the Emerging Players Programme, the England Women's Academy and played for the England Under-19s.

References

External links
 
 

1996 births
Living people
Cricketers from Birmingham, West Midlands
Alumni of Loughborough University
Warwickshire women cricketers
Loughborough Lightning cricketers
Southern Vipers cricketers
Central Sparks cricketers
The Blaze women's cricketers
Birmingham Phoenix cricketers
Trent Rockets cricketers